Deirdre is a Belfast camogie club that played in the first two finals of the All Ireland club championship although without success.
It was founded in 1929 forming the Senior Camogie league in South Antrim with Ardoyne, Gaedhil Uladh McKelvey's, O'Connell's and St Mary's Training college.
They won their first Antrim championships back to back in 1937 and 1938.

References

External links
 Camogie.ie Official Camogie Association Website
 Wikipedia List of Camogie clubs

Camogie clubs in County Antrim
Gaelic games clubs in County Antrim